Metasphenisca longulior is a species of tephritid or fruit flies in the genus Metasphenisca of the family Tephritidae.

Distribution
Kenya, Zambia, Namibia, South Africa.

References

Tephritinae
Insects described in 1929
Diptera of Africa